State Route 78 (SR-78) is a  state highway in the U.S. state of Utah that serves as a connector from the town of Levan and SR-28 to Interstate 15 (I-15) and the Chicken Creek Reservoir. The route was formed in 1977 and has preserved its initial state since then.

Route description
The road begins at a diamond interchange with I-15 at exit 207. From that point, the route heads northwest as a two-lane undivided highway, running almost parallel to I-15 in the west and Chicken Creek Reservoir in the east. Once the route passes the reservoir, it eventually turns north-northwesterly until reaching the intersection of a local road, where it turns east. The route enters Levan as 100 North and soon terminates at SR-28, the main street of Levan.

The east–west portion of SR-78 between Levan and Elevator Road is a part of the National Highway System.

Photo Gallery

History
In 1975, as Interstate 15 was being constructed in the area, State Route 163 was designated along the old alignment of US-91 from I-15 at Mills Junction to SR-28 in Levan. Since this route shared a number with U.S. Route 163 in southern Utah, it was renumbered to SR-78 in the 1977 Utah state route renumbering. The only change that has occurred to the route since then was a change to the legal definition in 1987, making it more detailed.

Major intersections

See also

References

External links

078
 078